Sherita Hill Golden is an American physician who is the Hugh P. McCormick Family Professor of Endocrinology and Metabolism at Johns Hopkins University. She also serves as Vice President and Chief diversity officer. Her research considers biological and systems influences on diabetes and its outcomes. She was elected Fellow of National Academy of Medicine in 2021.

Early life and education 
Golden is from Maryland. She was an undergraduate at the University of Maryland, College Park, which she graduated summa cum laude. She moved to the University of Virginia School of Medicine for her medical degree, and graduated a member Alpha Omega Alpha. She was the first African-American to be awarded the C. Richard Bowman Scholarship for clinical excellence. Whilst she had originally intended to become a paediatrician, she was inspired by a diabetes expert at Virginia to change her speciality. At the time, diabetes was a growing public health epidemic, and Golden became concerned by the physical and mental impacts. She trained in internal medicine at the Johns Hopkins University, where she simultaneously completed a Master of Health Science. She was elected to the Delta Omega society at the Johns Hopkins Bloomberg School of Public Health.

Research and career 
Golden's research considers glucose management in diabetes patients. She was appointed Director of the Johns Hopkins Hospital Inpatient Glucose Management Program in 2003. In particular, Golden investigates the structural inequalities that impact the treatment of minority ethnic populations. In the United States, minority ethnic populations often live in less well-resourced communities than their white counterparts. She has called for more farmers markets, opportunities to order healthy foods at libraries and more traditional grocery stores in deprived communities. Golden has also called for healthcare providers to mandate anti-racism and unconscious bias training. These courses can help to avoid misdiagnosis and treatment of conditions in Black patients, and has been successfully delivered at Johns Hopkins. She was the first to demonstrate the connection between depression and diabetes, i.e. suffering from depression made a person more likely to suffer from diabetes, and having diabetes predicted risk of developing depression.

As Vice Chair for the Department of Medicine at Johns Hopkins, Golden established evidence-based practises for diabetes care and the Journeys in Medicine speaker series, which became a major civic engagement initiative. She worked with her local community to handle the unrest that followed the 2015 death of Freddie Gray. She was elected to the board of the American Diabetes Association in 2018.

Awards and honors 
 2015 Innovations in Clinical Care Award
 2015 American Diabetes Association Diabetes Hero Award
 2017 University of Virginia Walter Reed Distinguished Achievement Award
 2018 Annual Women Worth Watching Award
 2019 University of Virginia Distinguished Alumna Award
 2021 Elected member of the National Academy of Medicine

Selected publications

Personal life 
Golden is married to Christopher Golden, Director of the Newborn Nursery and Professor of Paediatrics at the Johns Hopkins School of Medicine. Together they have one son.

References

External links 
 

African-American women physicians
Living people
Members of the National Academy of Medicine
Year of birth missing (living people)
Women endocrinologists
21st-century American women physicians
21st-century American physicians
21st-century American women scientists
21st-century American biologists
Physician-scientists
University of Maryland, College Park alumni
University of Virginia School of Medicine alumni
Johns Hopkins Bloomberg School of Public Health alumni
Johns Hopkins University faculty